This is a partial list of compositions by Franz Lachner.

Works with opus number
By opus number:

Works without opus number

Notes

References
Wulf, Jürgen (1999) (in German). Die Geistliche Vokalmusik Franz Lachners: Biographische und stilistische Untersuchungen mit thematischem Verzeichnis. Hildesheim: Georg Olms Verlag. .
Bussenius, Arthur Friedrich (1856) (in German). ""Die" Componisten der neueren Zeit: Adam, Auber, Beethoven ... ; in Biographien geschildert. Franz, Vincenz, Ignaz Lachner : Biographien · Volume 39". Ernst Balde Verlag.

External links
 (Worklist, pp. 50–55).

Lachner, Franz Paul